Ely is an unincorporated community in Lee County, Virginia, United States.

A post office was established at Ely in 1890, and closed the following year, in 1891. Robert Ely was an early settler.

References

Unincorporated communities in Lee County, Virginia
Unincorporated communities in Virginia